Asida is a large genus of darkling beetles. They have been located around western Europe, in particular near the Mediterranean Sea.

Subgenera
The genus is divided up into 23 subgenera which in turn contain a large number of species. There are also some species not yet specified to a subgenus.

References

Further reading
Due nuove Asida Latr. di Sardegna (Coleoptera Tenebrionidae).
Synopsis des Asidini d'Algerie et de Tunisie 2. (Coleoptera, Tenebrionidae).
Adiciones y correcciones ai "Ensayo sobre los Asida Latr., de Marruecos" (Col. Tenebrionidae).
Ensayo sobre las Asida Latr. de Marruecos (Col. Tenebr.).
Contribution a l'etude des Asida Latr. de France.

Tenebrionidae genera
Beetles of Europe